Doolin Run is a stream in the U.S. state of West Virginia.

Doolin Run was named after Edward Doolin, a pioneer who was scalped by Indians.

See also
List of rivers of West Virginia

References

Rivers of Wetzel County, West Virginia
Rivers of West Virginia